Hope is an unincorporated community in Vermilion County, Illinois, United States.

Mark Van Doren (1894–1972), poet and writer, was born in Hope.

Notes

Unincorporated communities in Vermilion County, Illinois
Unincorporated communities in Illinois